Union Center is an unincorporated community in LaPorte County, Indiana, in the United States.

The community took its name from Union Township.

References

Unincorporated communities in LaPorte County, Indiana
Unincorporated communities in Indiana